The Tocuyo sparrow (Arremonops tocuyensis) is a species of bird in the family Passerellidae that is found in Colombia and cities like Tocuyo and Lara of Venezuela. Its natural habitats are subtropical or tropical dry forest and subtropical or tropical dry shrubland. The species' name comes from Tocuyo de la Costa, a town in Venezuela, which it inhabits.

References

Tocuyo sparrow
Birds of Venezuela
Tocuyo sparrow
Tocuyo sparrow
Taxonomy articles created by Polbot